Cervisia is a graphical front end for Concurrent Versions System (CVS).

Cervisia implements the common CVS functions of adding, removing, and committing files. More advanced capabilities include importing and checking-out modules, adding/removing watches, editing/unediting and locking/unlocking files, blame-annotated file viewing, tagging/branching, conflict resolution/mergings and the ability to update to a given tag or branch.  Additionally, it has graphical functions that include tree and list views of the change log of a file, color-coded file status, and graphical diff'ing between versions, similar to xdiff.

Cervisia started to be updated to Qt 5 and  KDE Frameworks 5 in November 2015. The porting ended in June 2016

References

External links
 

Concurrent Versions System
Free version control software
KDE Applications
Version control GUI tools